Estigmene acrea, the salt marsh moth or acrea moth, is a moth in the family Erebidae. The species was first described by Dru Drury in 1773. It is found in North America, the Democratic Republic of the Congo, Kenya, Colombia, Mexico.

Description
The head and thorax are white and the abdomen is yellow orange with a row of black spots. The forewing is white with a variable pattern of black spots, with some individuals lacking any spots. The hindwing is yellow orange in males and white in females. Both sexes have three or four black spots or blotches on the hindwings. The wingspan measures .

Flight
This moth is generally seen from May to August, but it is seen all year in southern Florida and southern Texas.

Life cycle
The yellowish eggs are laid in clusters on the host plant leaves. The larva, known as the salt marsh caterpillar, which grows to about 5 cm (2 in) in length, is highly variable in color, ranging from pale yellow to rusty orange brown to dark brownish black. It is hairy, with numerous soft setae, growing in tufts (several tufts on each segment), with a few individual hairs that are longer toward the end of the body. The thoracic and abdominal segments have a few rows of orange or black warts, and it has one tiny white dot per segment, on both sides of its body. It pupates in a cocoon, made in part from its own hair, usually by wrapping itself in a leaf or other debris. While inside the cocoon, it remains a larva through the winter, pupates in spring, and emerges as an adult in late spring. In the southern parts of its range it may have several generations per year. Unlike most moth species, which emit the sex pheromone from a gland at the tip of the abdomen, female bagworms release their pheromone from specific gland cells located on the thorax and/or the anterior part of the abdomen (Leonhardt et al. 1983; Subchev et al. 2000).

Host plants
Host plants used by the caterpillar include dandelions, cabbage, cotton, walnuts, apple, tobacco, pea, potato, clovers, and maize.

The moth does not seem to be affected by any type of pyrrolizidine alkaloid present in many plant families, including the borage, legume, dogbane, and orchid families, and the tribes Senecioneae and Eupatorieae of the aster family. It is sensitive to alkaloids due to its pyrrolizidine alkaloid-specific taste receptors. It can detoxify them and even convert them into sex pheromones.

Subspecies
 Estigmene acrea acrea
 Estigmene acrea arizonensis Rothschild, 1910 (Arizona)
 Estigmene acrea mexicana (Walker, [1865}) (Mexico)
 Estigmene acrea columbiana Rothschild, 1910 (Colombia)

Gallery

References

6.Rahmani, R., Carrasco, D., Svensson, G. P., Roweck, H., Ryrholm, N., Larsson, M. C., & Hedenström, E. (2020). Identification and Synthesis of Putative Pheromone Components of the Threatened Salt Marsh Bagworm Moth, Whittleia retiella (Lepidoptera: Psychidae). Journal of chemical ecology, 46(2), 115–127. https://doi.org/10.1007/s10886-020-01145-x

External links

 

Spilosomina
Moths of North America
Moths of Africa
Moths of Central America
Fauna of the Southwestern United States
Moths of South America
Moths described in 1773
Taxa named by Dru Drury